The Protective Trust is a form of settlement found in England and Wales and several Commonwealth countries. It has marked similarities to asset-protection trusts found in several offshore jurisdictions and US Spendthrift trusts.

In such a trust assets are ordinarily held to pay an income to the beneficiary.  The beneficiary may also have access to capital of the trust with the trustee's permission. The right to receive income from a trust would ordinarily be an asset in the hands of the beneficiary and could be sold, thwarting the intention of the donor to spread the gift over the recipient's lifetime.  Additionally on a bankruptcy the right to the income would be sold by the beneficiary's trustee in bankruptcy.

To give protection to beneficiaries, a protective trust automatically converts into a discretionary trust, under which the beneficiary has no right to the income, if anything is done which breaches a condition specified in the document creating the trust.

The establishment of this discretionary trust is ordinarily exempt from the charge to UK inheritance tax on the establishment of discretionary trusts.

Such protective trusts have a longstanding history.  To reduce the verbose definitions that had previously to be recited in the establishing documents of a protective trust, in England and Wales s33 of the Trustee Act 1925 (and equivalent legislation in other jurisdictions) provides that this protection will arise in any trust described as a "protective trust" in its trust deed.

Protective trusts are subject to challenge under creditor protection legislation as are any other forms of asset-protection.  However many jurisdictions do not permit a trust to be broken where a debtor who remains a discretionary beneficiary only under a trust and cannot access the fund without the exercise of the trustees' discretion in his favour.

See also
 Asset protection

Wills and trusts